Production Linked Incentive, or PLI, scheme of the Government of India is a form of performance-linked incentive to give companies incentives on incremental sales from products manufactured in domestic units.  It is aimed at boosting the manufacturing sector and to reduce imports. Objective of these schemes entail Make in India, incentivising foreign manufacturers to start production in India and incentivise domestic manufacturers to expand their production and exports. The GoI has introduced Rs 1.97 lakh cr (US$ 28 b) PLI schemes for 13 sectors. For example one of these sectors is the Automotive industry in India, for which GoI introduced 3 schemes, a Rs. 26,000 cr (US$3.61 b) scheme for production of electric vehicles and hydrogen fuel vehicles (PEVHV), the Rs 18,000 crore (US$2.5 b) "Advanced Chemistry Cell" (ACC) scheme for new generation advance storage technologies for the electric vehicles, and Rs 10,000 crore (US$1.4 b) "Faster Adaption of Manufacturing of Electric Vehicles" (FAME) scheme to go green by expediting production of more electronic vehicles and replacement of other types of existing vehicles with the greener vehicles. The PLI scheme to boost automotive sector to encourage the production of electric vehicles and hydrogen fuel vehicles will also generate 750,000 direct jobs in auto sector. These schemes will reduce pollution, climate change, carbon footprint, reduce oil and fuel import bill through domestic alternative substitution, boost job creation and economy. Society of Indian Automobile Manufacturers welcomed this as it will enhance the competitiveness and boost growth.

List of industries 

The government has introduced the scheme for several industries which include:

 Auto components
 Automobile
 Aviation
 Chemicals
 Electronic systems
 Food processing
 Medical devices
 Metals & mining
 Pharmaceuticals
 Renewable energy
 Telecom
 Textiles & apparel
 White goods

References

Economy of India
Government programmes of India
Modi administration initiatives